Edward Burke Burdett (March 10, 1921 – November 18, 1967) was a brigadier general in the United States Air Force who was one of the highest-ranked American military officers killed during the Vietnam War.  Burdett was the 388th Tactical Fighter Wing commander and had been an F-86 Sabre pilot in Korea.  In Vietnam while flying an F-105 Thunderchief, he was hit by an SA-2 surface-to-air missile and was forced to eject. Burdett was captured, but he died the same day on November 18, 1967.

References

External links
 
 Edward B. Burdett at The POW Network

1921 births
1967 deaths
American military personnel killed in the Vietnam War
United States Air Force generals
Brigadier generals
United States Military Academy alumni
Shot-down aviators
Vietnam War prisoners of war
American Vietnam War pilots
United States Air Force personnel of the Vietnam War